The posterior nucleus of the hypothalamus is one of the many nuclei that make up the hypothalamic region of the brain.

Its functions include elevation of blood pressure, pupillary dilation, and shivering or body heat conservation (thermoregulation).
Damage or destruction of this nucleus causes hypothermia. Descending efferents from the nucleus synapse on the sympathetic neurons of the spinal cord, which exist in the thoracic and lumbar regions in the lateral horns.

References

Hypothalamus